Throughout the 13th and 14th century, the ancestors of the Vainakh people, the Durdzuks, among different states and factions, waged a brutal and fierce war against the Mongol Empire, who sought to occupy the lands of the Vaynakh. Despite the inferiority in numbers and weapons, the Durdzuks managed to mostly keep their independence, although this also came at a heavy cost, as their resistance resulted in mass amounts of death among the Durdzuks and the destruction of their states, but also greatly shaped the people they would later become. The access to the lowlands was also lost, thus forcing the Durdzuks to adapt to their new situation, such as terracing plots of land and covering them in soil.

The Sado-Orsoy dynasty, a clan which had been ruling the medieval Nakh state known as "Durdzuketi" in Georgian sources, was also driven to near extinction. Due to their constant resistance, at the end of the third Mongol campaign in 1240, an active result of heirs began, after which the royal house of Orsoy survived through only two royalties.

Caucasus raid

Background
In 1220, Genghis Khan sent his commanders Subutai and Jebe on a campaign to reach "eleven countries and peoples", among whom were "Kibchaut" (Kipchak Turks), "Orosut" (Kievan Rus), "Serkesut" (Circassia), "Asut" (Alania and Durdzuks who recognized Khasi I),"Sessut"(Durdzuks who did not recognize Khasi I) and others.

Prelude
In 1221, the Mongol army, counting around 30.000 Mongols, excluding their allies, led by Subutai and Jebe, invaded and defeated some 30,000 Georgians and Armenians in the Battle of Khunan. After their victory, the Mongols advanced north, plundering today's northern Armenia and Azerbaijan, including the city Shemakha.
Following their victory in Georgia, the Mongols advanced north, eventually reaching Derbent. However, the nomads did not succeed in taking the city, thus they treacherously killed Lezgin ambassadors, allowing them to capture the city. After passing the Derbent pass, the Mongols entered the Andiy range, ravaging and killing civilians on the way, until they eventually entered the medieval Nakh peoples state Durdzuketi. Following their route, the Mongols passed by modern-day Kharachoy, Vedeno, then the Khulkhulau gorge, Shali, and lastly, modern-day Grozny.

Sunzha clash
On their way through the Caucasus, the Mongols struck fear into the locals with "massacres, robbery and devastation". These Mongols, according to Ibn al-Asir, "had pity on no one, they beat men, women, babies, ruptured the wombs of pregnant women and killed the fetuses." According to legends, the ancestors of the Chechens used traditional methods of defending their land when the enemy moved along the gorge: blockades, throwing rocks, battling in the forest, luring the enemy into their territory and massive pursuit, exhausting and demoralizing enemy forces, and only after that, a decisive victory. Thus, giving the Durdzuks enough time to prepare for a larger battle.

Battle of Khankala
After having severely halted the Mongol advance, the Durdzuks allied themselves with the Alans, Lezgins and Circassians. The Cumans also joined the army, and convinced the Volga Bulgars and the Khazars to join. This army counted around 50,000 men. The Cuman khan, Koten, placed the army under his brother, Yuri, and his son, Daniel. In the following battle of Khankala, despite the coalition's victory, its victory was indecisive. In the second battle, the Mongols convinced the "Polovtsy" (Kipchak Turks, Cumans, Khazars and Volga Bulgars) to leave the battlefield by reminding them of the Turkic-Mongol friendship and promising them a share of the booty gained from the Caucasian tribes. The trick worked, and with the tide of the battle turned, the Mongols successfully defeated the Caucasian alliance.

Aftermath
After the crucial defeat of the North Caucasian alliance, the Mongols ravaged the region and then attacked the Kipchak Turks, who were returning back in their home country, and scattered them across the Caucasus. One group fled south, conquering Derbent and then breaking into the South Caucasus, while the other part fled north, asking for help from Russian princes. The Mongols then continued north, reaching the southern Russian steppes and eventually today's Ukraine, where they defeated a European alliance, among whom were the Principality of Kiev, the Cumans and others in the Battle of the Kalka River.

Uprising of 1227
In 1227, after the death of Genghis Khan and his son Jochi, thus leading to powerful waves of urban and peasant uprisings by the conquered peoples that swept across the empire, such as in the North Caucasus, Eastern Europe, China, Iran, South Caucasus and Central Asia, allowing the conquered people to politically break free from the Mongol Empire. All this frightened the Mongol feudal lords, who rushed to enthrone a new emperor.

Second Mongol invasion
In 1228, the newly elected Ögedei Khan sent an army around 30,000 men strong to Eastern Europe and the North Caucasus to crush the rebellion. In 1229, after 6 months, the army arrived at its destiny and began military operations. In the same years, also 1229-1233, the North Caucasus also became involved in hostilities. 
Among the rebellious peoples, after the deaths of Jochi and Genghis Khan, the sources mention the Alans and Circassians. And the Hungarian traveler Julian, who visited Alania in 1235, testifies not only to the feudal fragmentation of the region, but also to the fact that, in anticipation of an attack by the Mongols, even on haymaking, plowing or chopping firewood, the Alans “all pull together and armed."
By this time the Horde had managed to scatter the Polovtsians in all directions and depopulate the Cis-Caucasian steppes. The same Julian who traveled west from the Sea of Azov along the Ciscaucasia for 13 days found neither “neither man nor house” there until he reached Alania.

Main Mongol invasion

Background
In 1236, Ögedei Khan sent Batu Khan, Güyük, Büri and Möngke Khan together with an army counting more than 200,000 to help Subutai in conquering the rebellious Eastern European as well as North Caucasian nations. Among the mentioned rebellious nations were the Circassians, Alans, Russians and others.

Prelude
In 1237, the Mongol invasion of Circassia began, during which the Mongols destroyed settlements and ravaged the entire country. Meanwhile, Subutai, along with other Mongol commanders was sent into "The land of the Ases" (Alania and Durdzuketi).
In autumn of 1237, in a battle between the Circassians and the Mongols, the ruler of Zichia (medieval Circassian kingdom), Tuqar, was killed, leading to the mass migration of Circassians to the mountains as well as the start of a pro-Mongol administration.

Campaign in Circassia
After a pro-Mongol administration was established, Khasi I, the king of Alania and Durdzuketi during that time, sent a request to the new administration, in which he asked for the status of satrapy of Alania, to which they refused, after which Khasi sent an army led by his son, Khour I to Circassia to fight the Mongols.

Start of the Mongol campaign
After the successful invasion of Zichia, in winter of 1238, the Mongols continued east, reaching the Kingdom of Alania. After ravaging the country sides for exactly on year, the Mongols, in November of 1238, reached the capital of Alania, Maghas, after which Khasi I ordered the withdrawal of troops in Circassia led by Khour to defend the city. Having occupied the western parts of the Terek, Mongol troops, led by Subutai, Kadan, Büri and Möngke Khan also began arriving at the north of the river. According to Chechen legends, the Khan gave the Chechens an ultimatum, demanding annual tribute and other things. The Chechens responded with "Everything for the Khan... But only, when we're not there anymore." 
According to the Persian historian Rashid al-Din Hamadani, the "Sassan people" managed to hold the Mongols back at the Terek River by winning 2 or 3 battles.
However, with the fall of Derbent and the Kingdom of Georgia not long after, the Mongols were able to invade Durdzuketi from the east and south respectively. According to popular Chechen folktale, an emergency meeting was held in the capital of the Durdzuk Confederation, Tsontaroy, in which it was decided that an army led by Idig, a hunter, would stop the southern Mongol advance at Mt. Tebulosmta. The operation ended in a success, with Idig managing to halt the Mongol advance for the following 12 years. Despite its legendary origins, the story corresponds to reports of western travellers, such as Giovanni da Pian del Carpine, who noted that the Alans defended a mountain for 12 years. The dates also correspond, as his work was released in 1250, meaning that the year the siege began, in 1238, is the same year of the start of the main Mongol campaign in Alania and Durdzuketi.

Boturcha rebellion
Before the start of the main Mongol invasion, the ruler of the village Boturcha, prince Botur (from the Dishniy clan of Chechnya), known as "Ela Botur" in Chechen and "Ele Badur" in the Chinese chronicle Yuan-Shi, conducted secret negotiations with the Mongol Empire, in which he discussed an independent state under his rule. At the start of the Mongol campaign in 1238, he and his family, such as his 2 brothers Matarsha and Utszorbu Khan came to Möngke Khan and expressed their obedience, thus declaring a rebellion against Khasi I, after which he sent an army led by his brother Matarsha to Maghas in order to help the Mongols in besieging the city. This decision was supported by most of the Dishniy clan, especially Botur's family.

Return of Navraz
Navraz, a former king of Durdzuketi, after his defeat by Chechen rebels in 1191, he and his remaining army fled north of the Terek river, where he worked on rebuilding his former strength. With the arrival of the Mongols, Navraz accepted Mongol citizenship and actively took part in the invasion on the side of the Mongol Empire.

Siege of Maghas
In November of 1239, the Mongols laid siege to the capital of Alania, Maghas, according to several historians and geographers was located on the Alkhan-Kala settlement in Chechnya, while most agree that it was located on the Chechen plain. According to the Chinese chronicle "Yuan-Shi", Maghas was surrounded by swamps and huge dense forests that "It was difficult for the wind to get through". Because of this, the Mongols cut down the forests and paved roads for the army to get around easier, after which the Mongol army (among whom was Matarsha, whose army was in the vanguard) began the siege.

Not long after the siege began, Khour I and his army arrived back from Circassia. He drove part of the Mongol army away and fought himself through, eventually entering the city, after which he fortified himself in there. Khour's wife, despite being the niece of Botur, supported the resistance. During the siege, she expected a child, after which she left the city through a secret gorge and gave birth to Khour's only son, Chakh.

The defence of Maghas was fierce. Regularly, there were attempts to take the city by storm, however, all of them failed. In January of 1240, the Mongol commanders Batu Khan, Kadan, Güyük and Möngke Khan ordered one, this time, large assault on the city. By shelling the city, the Mongols managed to climb the walls using siege ladders, and, after a short battle inside the city, the Mongols finally captured the city, after which it was destroyed. According to the "Book of Victories", 270,000 civilians were killed after the victory. However, because no Mongol reports talks about this number, and especially since this claim was only announced 150 years after the siege, this figure is greatly exaggerated. Chechen legends claims that the older population of Maghas was rotten out in order to erease the history of the Durdzuks.

After the fall of Maghas, Batu Khan sent a report to Ögedei Khan, saying "By the power of the Eternal Sky and the greatness of the sovereign and uncle, we destroyed the city of Meget (Maghas) and subjugated eleven countries and peoples to your righteous power, and intending to turn the golden reins to the house, we decided to arrange a farewell feast."

Following the fall of Maghas, the Mongols, after another brutal battle, also captured and destroyed the second largest city and the religious center of Alania, "Ghulariy Sa'ngarsh", which was located on the Sunzha River.

End of the first Durdzuk resistance
The fall and destruction of Maghas broke the elderly king Khasi I. He recognized the dominion of the Mongols and signed a peace treaty with the Mongol Empire, for which he and his son Atachi received gifts.

In the peace treaty, Khasi I had to
Pay annual tribute to the Mongols.
Send his oldest son, Atachi, to serve in the Mongol army.
Send a detachment of around 1,000 men to serve in the Mongol army.
Khasi also accompanied the Mongols in some of their campaigns until his death one year later in 1241.

The actions and later life of the legendary Chechen king Khasi I corresponds to the historical personality "Khusy Khan", mentioned in the Chinese chronicle Yuan Shi. In there, it is written, that "Khan Khusy, ruler of the land of the Ases (Alans and Durdzuks)" submitted to Ögedei Khan.

Insurgency in Durdzuketi

Prelude
The Durdzuks and Alans were the last people in the Caucasus to surrender. After the capitulation, the Mongols greatly decreased their troops stationed in Alania and Durdzuketi, and, according to Rashid al-Din Hamadani, a persian historian, the Mongol troops stationed in "The land of the Assos" counted around 10,000. Although, depending on the severety of the resistance, troops stationed in other regions would regularly be brought to Alania and also Circassia.

Already after the capitulation Khour I rejected the decision made by his father. The thought of submission was hateful to him. Between the years 1240-1241, Khour I raised an army for an uprising. In 1241, Ögedei Khan died, which, after the news of it spread, led to several major uprisings in the Caucasus, especially in Circassia, where, for the previous 4-5 years, it had been relatively calm. With the death of Ögedei Khan, Khour I launched the uprising, but this time, in the mountains of Durdzuketi.

Fate of Khasi I
According to Yuan-Shi, Khasi I/Khan Khusy died on a campaign against the "rebellious Alans": 
"Upon his return (from the campaign), Atachi joined the guards (suway), (his father) Khan Khusy met enemies on the way and died in battle."

However, Chechen sources deny this and state that because of the disobedience of Khour I, Khasi I was brutally executed by the Mongols, who first gouged his eyes out, after which he was quartered.

Start of the insurgency
After the death of his father, Khour I, despite his older brother Atachi, declared himself the sole legitimate heir of Khasi I and under him, the resistance continued. He began the path with the renounciation of Christianity and the adoptian of a "military cult", as well as the adoption of a new nickname, Mokhtsur.

After the start of the rebellion, an active hunt of members of the royal house began, as a result of which only two members of the Sado-Orsoy dynasty survived: Khour I, his son Chakh, as well as Ors.

Struggle for power and the collapse of Durdzuketi
The execution of Khasi led to an intensification of struggle for power in Durdzuk lands, on the one side being Botur's regime, while on the other, Khour's regime. To restore the stability, the Mongols preferred a member of the royal house — Prince Ors Sado-Orsoy, also known as "Ors Ela" or "Ars-Alan" in Yuan Shi. He is the ancestor of the Elistanzhiy clan of Chechnya and an Orthodox Christian by religion. He ruled over the city Arsoy, located in south eastern Chechnya. In the Chinese chronicle Yuan-Shi, among the names of Alan rulers who submitted to the Mongol-Tatars and constituted an administration of vassal Alania, the name Ars-Alan is mentioned.

The Mongol forces led by Möngke Khan gathered near the city, he humbly appeared to them. In a meeting not far from today's Makhkety village, the title of ruler was given to Ors. H. A. Khizriev writes: "For example, when Möngke Khan took the city of the "Assun ruler" Ars-Alan and the latter expressed his obedience to him, he "issued to Ars-Alan a charter to govern the Assu people". In the agreement, Ors, just like Khasi, had to send 1,000 soldiers as well as give his oldest son, Asanzhen to serve in the Mongl army and accompany Möngke Khan in his campaigns. Not long afterwards however Möngke's army, among whom was Asanzhen, fought against rebels, in a battle of which Asanzhen was killed. Möngke ordered his body to be wrapped in cloth and returned to his father. Following that, Ors said to Möngke "My oldest son died, he could not work for the state. Now I will give you my second son, Nikolay, so that you can use his services."

The most faithful ally of the Mongols, Botur of Dishniy, was also not left without attention. He received most of the plain of the modern day Chechnya, including the towns Aldy and Vedeno, which had previously belonged to the Sadoy clan. Despite this however, Botur, in order to strengthen his power and authority, undertook a number of tricks to divide the Sado-Orsoy clan.

According to folklore, in the west, near the Darial Gorge, the Egiy clan occupied a strong position. Having gotten the support of the Mongols, the Egiy clan collected tribute of neighboring tribes as well as armies trying to pass the "Gates of Durdzuk" (Assa gorge), eventually allowing the Egiy clan to extend their power over their neighbors.

Other movements of resistance
According to the Chechen chronicle "Aukhar Teptar", during the main Mongol campaign against Alania and Durdzuketi, the resistance in the region Aukh, known as "Ovkhoy" in Chechen, (who were not ruled by Khasi I), was led by Taymaskhi. The later died in a battle near the Terek River.

The inhabitants of the Argun gorge, after being forced to flee their native land, took up defensive positions on the slopes of Mt. Tebulosmta, where a combination of men, women and children, successfully defended the mountain and went on to reconquer their homeland.

Idig and the siege of Mt. Tebulosmta
According to Chechen folklore, Idig was a famous hunter. With the start of the main Mongol campaign in 1238, a meeting was held by the national council, in which it was decided that the southern Mongol advance would be stopped at Mt. Tebulosmta. An expedition of 12 Chechen fighters under the leadership of the 50 year old Idig were sent to find a way to climb the mountain.
It was decided by Idig that the mountain would be climbed «From where the sun rises» (the East). Although, after approaching the path, they saw several cliffs and glaciers. Despite that however, Idig still decided to climb it using that path. Bad weather haltered their mission for three days, in which the group hid in a cave. While continuing their mission, the group was hit by an avalanche. Out of the original 12 people in the detachment, only 2 survived, excluding Idig, all of whom were injured.
A rescue team was sent to find the detachment, which eventually saved them and brought them back home.

Soon after, the Mongol conquest began. Idig, who had recovered, suggested that the mountain shall be climbed from «Where the sun sets» (the West). After having successfully reached the top, the Chechen fighters fortified themselves on it. Soon after, Mongol troops arrived and occupied the exit gorge. Not expecting an attack, the Mongols set up a camp. In the night however, the militia attacked the camp by raining down arrows, spears and rocks. This confused the Mongol troops, who began attacking each other, thinking the opposite enemy. Soon after, they retreated.
The next day, the Mongols tried capturing the mountain, but suffered heavy losses, forcing them to retreat. This continued for a month.
Then fall began, forcing the Mongols to flee the area because of the lack of supplies for their horses. Several mountains later, with the beginning of summer, the Mongols reappeared and besieged the mountain again.
This cycle continued for 12 years, after which the Mongols had already taken the supplies of the Chechen fighters. The Mongols promised to negotiate peace with the militia if they descended from the mountain, which they agreed to. The nomads then treacherously killed them. This fate was only escaped by Idig as well as his followers, who continued to defend the mountain for a short time until managing to escape.

This battle, despite being of legendary origin, corresponds to reports of Western travellers, such as Giovanni da Pian del Carpine, who reports that the eastern Alans had defended a mountain for 12 years. Considering that his work was published in 1250, the siege began in 1238 and ended in 1250, which are the exact dates given in the legend.

The insurgency and its slow decline
Ors' rule was opposed by the Sadoy and Peshkhoy clans, who resisted his regime. As a result, Ors invaded and drove the clans out of their land, forcing them to join Khour's counter campaign in the mountains. While on his campaigns to stabilize the region, Ors established the settlement Ela-Zh'aran-Korta ("Princely cross top", basically serving as the capital of Ors' regime), from which the clan Elistanzhoy descends today, that being, from Ors.

After joining Khour's insurgency, the Sadoy and Peshkhoy clans became the military bulk of the resistance army. With his army, Khour especially raided Mongols fortresses stationes in the Ch'antiy-Orga gorge, southeastern Chechnya. Today, this area is called "Mokhtsura B'o t'eba'kkhiniy nek'", meaning "The street where Mokhtsur raised an army", although Khour's army raided several posts and fortresses located in mountain gorges. One of such raids found place in 1252, on Mt. Sadoy-Lam, near the today's village Selmentauzen.

Battle of Sadoy-Lam
Before the battle, the pro-Mongol administrators of Durdzuketi, most importantly, Botur, Ors Ela and Navraz, gathered their forces on the mountain Sadoy-Lam in 1252. Combined with a Mongol detachment, this army counted around 13,000 men. During the battle that ensued, Khour's forces failed to capture the mountain and suffered a devastating defeat, which put a final end to the organized Durdzuk resistance.

The insurgency of Khour in the mountains lasted for around 12 years and ended with the betrayal and assassination of him by Georgian princes not long after the battle.

Aftermath of the third invasion and the insurgency
He was succeeded a year later by his 13 year old son, Chakh, who continued the work of his father, that being, resisting the Mongols. 

With the lowlands being occupied by pro-Mongol administrators, the Durdzuks were forced to adapt to their new situation, such as terracing plots of land and covering them in soil.

Great exodus of the Nakh
After the death of Khour, the Durdzuks migrated the issolated themselves in the mountains, making it impossible for the Mongol Empire to rule over them, thus, the Mongols fortified the entrances to mountain gorges, to prevent the mountaineers from descending and raiding mongol posts.  According to G. Rubruquis, a western traveller, 1/5th of the Khans army (40,000), were stationed in the North Caucasus to deal with the mountaineers, 10,000 of whom were stationed in "The land of the Asos", although, depending on the severety of the resistance, troops from neighboring regions were brought in to keep it under control.

Several tens of thousands of Alans and Durdzuks left the North Caucasus for Europe and other regions.

Struggle for power and land between Durdzuk administrators
Following the death of Khour I, the Mongols successfully provoked armed conflicts between the pro-Mongol administrators, such as between Ors Ela and Botur, weakening both in turn. Navraz, who wished for the region Nokhch-Mokhk back, got killed not long after the battle, thus dissolving the Kingdom of Navrazchö after more than 80 years of its establishment.

Berke-Hulagu war
After collapsing into several hordes, the North Caucasus became part of the Golden Horde, while the South Caucasus became a part of the Ilkhanate. In 1262, a war between the two hordes broke out, which turned the already devastated and destroyed North Caucasus into a battlefield.

In summer of 1262, 3 tumen (30,000 men) of the Golden Horde invaded Shirvan, which was under the control of the Ilkhanate, who responded with a counter attack, pushing the Golden Horde out of Shirvan, through the Darial Gorge, further to the Terek River, until eventually reaching the settlement Braguny, Chechnya. In January of 1263, a brutal battle, in which 300,000 men participated on both sides. It ended in a defeat for the Hulagud and their culminating retreat through Derbent, Dagestan and the consolidation of the Darial Gorge by the Golden Horde.
This war also ended in the devastation of today's Chechnya and Ingushetia.

Uprising of the North Caucasians

Prelude
In 1277, as a result of tax oppression, armed conflicts between the lowlanders of the North Caucasus and the Mongol Empire broke out (See "Other minor uprisings and clashes" section). This eventually led to a new large scale confrontation between the Golden Horde and the North Caucasians. Another reason why these movements were caused was the fact that the Mongols “not only swarmed, corrupted and withered the soul of the people who fell under it", as well as the establishment of a regime of systematic terror whose weapons were robberies and massacres. The dominance of the Golden Horde in the steppe zone of the North Caucasus was a time of severe trials for the native people.

Chakh
26 years after the death of his father Khour I, Chakh, father of Khasi II, organized a large rebellion against the Mongols, the uprising of the North Caucasians, commonly known as the Dedyakov rebellion.

The uprising
The territory of the uprising covered large parts of the North Caucasus, with its center in the Alan city Taodag, which is called Dedyakov in Russian chronicles, according to which, the uprising was so large that Mengu-Timur asked help from Russian princes, doubting that his army was large enough. He also had to personally put it down.

The "Glorious city Yassky Dedyakov" was besieged in the beginning of 1278, until it fell to the troops of Mengu-Timur in February of the same year. Chakh managed to escape, however, despite the devastating defeat, refused to surrender.

Aftermath and the fate of Chakh
The city was destroyed by Mongol troops following its fall. After this defeat, Chakh, along with his companions, fled into the mountains of Chechnya, aiming to reach the mountains north of the lake Kazenoy-Am, Southeastern Chechnya, on the border to Dagestan. However, the troops of the Khan managed to overtake Chakh and his detachment. The rebellious king, refusing to surrender to the Mongols, along with his companions, stabbed and killed themselves on horseback and then threw themselves off a cliff near the Arzhiy-Akhk river, eastern Chechnya. Chakh was succeeded by his son Khasi II, the father of Khour II, who continued the fight against the Mongols.

Rebellion of the Georgian monarch David VIII
During the reign of Gazan Khan, the Georgian king David VIII rebelled against the Ilkhanate. David, along with his grandees moved to Imereti where they fortified themselves in the fortress Modinakhe. Then, with the help of the Durdzuks, Pkhovians and Mtiulets, bringing together an army of 15,000, David VIII managed to oust the Mongols from the Darial Gorge, after which he withdrew to the fortress Tsiskari. In response, Gazan Khan sent an army to Georgia, which ravaged the regions Kartli and Tianeti, after which it laid siege to the Kazbegi fortress. However, being unable to capture it, the Mongols withdrew to Tskhavati. David then pursued the Mongols and defeated the latter, after which he attacked a Mongol army near Tbilisi, also defeating them, forcing them to leave the region.

Khasi's rebellion
In 1318, exactly 40 years after the last major uprising, Khasi II (who, unlike his ancestors, was a Muslim), the son of Chakh and the father of Khour II, launched another rebellion in the mountains of Durdzuketi. The uprising was supported by the free Durdzuk communities, although they did no longer recognize the royal ruler over themselves. The uprising lasted for a year, until 1319, but ultimately failed. Even though this rebellion is a rather legendary one, Amin Anguni suggests that the uprising of Khasi II was the reason why Khan Özbeg set up his headquarters on the Sunzha River.

According to other legends however, since Khasi II was a Muslim, he cooporated with the Golden Horde, unlike his ancestors.

Other minor uprisings and clashes
Only a year after the death of Khour I, 1253, as a result of Mongol taxation, resistance among several nations in the North Caucasus, among them, the Durdzuks, Alans, Lezgins and Circassians broke out. In 1254, because of the strong resistance, 1/5th of the Khans army (40,000) was stationed in mountain gorges across the North Caucasus.

In 1277, as a result of harsh taxes as well as the brutal policy of the Mongols towards the North Caucasus, armed conflicts between the lowlanders and the Golden Horde broke out. This would eventually lead to the large scale uprising of the North Caucasians, also known as the Dedyakov rebellion a year later in 1278.

In 1321, Chupan, a general of the Ilkhanate, successfully broke through the Darial Gorge, devastated today's North Ossetia-Alania, Ingushetia, Chechnya and Dagestan and then returned to the Ilkhanate through the Derbent pass.

In 1327, a large uprising broke out in the North Caucasus, in which the commander of the Mongol army, Hassan, was killed.

Durdzuk reconquest of the plain

Background
During the period known as the "Great troubles" in the Golden Horde, uprisings, civil wars and assassinations of Khans caused great instablity in the empire. According to folklore, this is where Khour's rebellion starts.

Prelude
After gathering the Mekhk-Khetasho (National assembly) in western Chechnya, completing the tasks given to him by the elders ("Syirs"), Khour II, also known as Gayur Khan or Kair Khan, was chosen the leader of the Vaynakh nation, after which he gathered a nation wide militia, which was funded by the Kingdom of Georgia, who supplied the armies with horses and handworkers.

In folklore
According to popular Chechen folklore, after having gathered his army, Khour II descended down from the mountains and took control over the two economic centers of the North Caucasus: Chir-Yurt, followed by Khunzakh. Then, he advanced north and ambushed the warlord Mamai on the Terek River. This forced him to retreat to the fortress Tatar-Tup, which was then besieged by Khour's army. After a long siege, the Chechen army won, forcing Mamai to flee to the city Madzhar, which was then attacked and mostly destroyed by Khour's troops, after which Mamai fled north. Khour hunted him and his army down, where they defeated several Nogai and Oirat garrisons not far from the Kuma River.

In history
A story about an army of "Lam Kersts" (Chechen: "Mountain Christians") was mentioned in a manuscpript by the Russian-Tatar general Sultan Kazi-Girey. It states that an army of "Lam Kersts" besieged the fortress Tatar-Tup and defeated Mamai, forcing him to flee. Then it states that the same army marched to the Kuma River and attacked Nogai and Oirat garrisons, doing "great damage to them". The manuscript also states that Khour's reconquest of the plain was between 1361-1362.

The legend of Khour II is also evidenced by archeological finds, as Golden Horde minted coins ceased to exist after the year 1362, but resurfaced in 1380, with the reign of Tokhtamysh, who was the ally of Khour II.

Aftermath
The successful reconquest of the plain as well as defeat of Mamai severely weakening the Golden Horde allowed the establishment of a new, independent Durdzuk state―Princedom of Simsim.
Further, (Nakh) rulers of fragments of the former Kingdom of Alania united several regions, thus forming kingdoms, as well as other nations. Those were:
Princedom of Simsim, modernChechnya, Ingushetia, and parts of Dagestan, ruled and established by Khour II, its capital being the Simsar village.
Kingdom of Buriberd, modern Karachay-Cherkessia and Pjatigorye, ruled and established by Burak Khan, its capital being the Buriberd fortress.
Kingdom of Pulad, modernNorth Ossetia-Alania and parts of Ingushetia and Kabardino-Balkaria, ruled and established by Pul-Adi, its capital being the Pulad fortress.
Kingdom of Kuli and T'aus, modern Kabardino-Balkaria, ruled and established by Kuli and T'aus, its capital being the fortresses Kuli and T'aus
Avar Khanate, modern Southwestern region of Dagestan, ruled and established by Surakat, its capital being Khunzakh.
Note that in Zafarnama, the names of these kingdoms stem from the king that ruled over them, not the actual name of the state.

These states existed between 1362, with the end of Khour's reconquest of the plain, until 1395, with the Timurid invasions.

Insurgency in Aukh
Unlike its southern neighbor, the people of Aukh, known as "Ovkhoy" In Chechen and "Avakhar" in the chronicle Zafarnama, waged a brutal war against the Golden Horde. This war took place in the last quarter of the 15th century, was made up of five major battles. Due to the weakened status of the Golden Horde and the threat of Timur, Tokhtamysh could not focus on the "Avakhar" and withdrew. 

Yanbek, a commander from the Akkiy Teip of Chechnya, was elected the leader of the uprising. In the first two battles, the Battle of the Terek River and the Battle of Amarka, the Avakhar, led by Yanbek, successfully defeated the forces of the Golden Horde. During the 3rd battle however, the most brutal one according to Amin Anguni, the Battle of Keshn'e, the Chechen forces were almost defeated. During the battle, an army from the Gazikumukh Shamkhalate under Shovkhal, also opposers of the Golden Horde, came to help the Avakhar in their struggle. The tide of the battle was turned, with approximately 3.000 Mongol soldiers being killed. Yanbek however was also killed during the battle, and was succeeded by his son Ma'adiy, who continued the insurgency. Today, the mountins in Aukh are called "Yanbeka lamnash", meaning "Yanbeks mountains".Almost nothing is known about the fourth battle, but there is a historical reference to the 5th and final battle, the Battle of Dylym.

Before the Battle of Dylym found place, Timur, who prepared for an invasion of the Golden Horde, sent a "Rasul" (messenger) to Ma'adiy, expressing support for the Avakhar struggle against the Golden Horde. The allied forces of Aukh, Gazikumukh Shamkhalate and the Timurid Empire came out victorious, defeating the Golden Horde, after which the Mongols withdrew from the region, granting the Avakhar their independence. Despite Simsir and Golden horde's allied relations, the Avakhar did end up supporting their southern neighbor Simsir during the Timurid invasion.
The first 4 battles are more of a legendary event, however the 5th battle is mentioned in Zafarnama.

Aftermath and long term effects

Destruction and revival of a Durdzuk state
With the death of Chakh soon after the siege of Dedyakov, the principality of Durdzuketi dissolved, as the mountaineers no longer recognized the royal house above themselves. A Durdzuk state would later be established after Khour's reconquest of the plain, after which the Principality of Simsir was established, which would later collapse as a result of the Timurid invasions as well as the death of Surakat, after which a long period of political fragmentation and civil war followed.

Religious implications
Pagan sanctuaries as well as the Orthodox Christian churches in the south were utterly destroyed. Under the conditions of the invasion, Christianity was unable to sustain itself in Chechnya, and as its sanctuaries and priests fell, those who had converted reverted to paganism for spiritual needs. As a result, "neo-paganism" gained in ascendance, as many new pagan temples were built, while Orthodox Christian churches were converted. The Malkhi, Lam-Ähkiy, and Kist clans, which reside in southern areas, however, remained Orthodox Christian.

Cultural effects

The utter destruction of the Durdzuks' statehood, their lifestyle (and in the south, their religion), and much of their knowledge of history caused them to rebuild their culture in many ways. The population developed various methods of resistance and much of their later lifestyle during the resistance to the Mongols and in between the two wars. The clan system mapped onto battlefield organization. Guerrilla tactics using mountains and forests were perfected. It was during the Mongol invasions that the military defense towers that one associates today with the Vainakh population (see Nakh Architecture) came into being. Many served simultaneously as homes, as sentry posts, and as fortresses from which one could launch spears, arrows, etc. The overcrowding and lack of arable land caused the Chechens to devise new agricultural methods for the highlands including terracing plots and introducing soil.

During the period after the invasions, due to contacts between the Durdzuks and Mongol and Turkic populations, there was a low degree of Mongolian cultural influences dating back to the period. The period where the Durdzuk state of Simsir was at the influence of the Golden Horde (during the fourteenth century and ending in 1395 when Simsir was invaded by Timurlane because of this alliance) is thought by Amjad Jaimoukha to be the origin of the custom of `amanat, whereby the children of nobles were given as pledged hostages. Such children were sent to the Khanate's court, where they learned the Mongol language, and they could be put to death or enslaved if the Golden Horde desired. This custom later became associated with the giving of hostages to cement pledges across the North Caucasus.

The concept of mythical beast known as the "almaz" or "hun-sag", an evil forest creature with enchanted hair, also dates to Mongol influence (the same is true for the Circassian almesti) with the word almaz being a loan from Mongolian where it originally meant "forest-man"; Jaimoukha also proposes that the Mongol name may have become used in the place of a native name during the sojourn of the Golden Horde over Simsir.

See also
Timurid invasions of Simsim
History of Chechnya
Siege of Maghas
Khasi I
Khour I
Chakhig
Botur
Khasi II
Khour II
Princedom of Simsim
Chechen-Kazikumukh war
Battle of Sadoy-Lam

Notes

References

History of Ingushetia
Wars involving Ingushetia
History of Chechnya
Wars involving Chechnya
Durdzuketia
1230s conflicts
Dzurdzuketia